Walter Daniel Mazzolatti Rivarola (born 25 April 1990) is an Argentinean footballer. Besides Argentina, he has played in Brazil and Chile.

Honours

Club
Deportes Iquique
 Copa Chile: 2013–14

References

External links
 
 

1990 births
Living people
Argentine footballers
Argentine expatriate footballers
Association football forwards
National Premier Soccer League players
Chilean Primera División players
Primera Nacional players
Primera B Metropolitana players
Club de Gimnasia y Esgrima La Plata footballers
Deportes Iquique footballers
El Farolito Soccer Club players
San Luis de Quillota footballers
Central Sport Club players
Club Atlético Los Andes footballers
Expatriate footballers in Chile
Expatriate soccer players in the United States
Expatriate footballers in Brazil
Argentine expatriate sportspeople in Chile
Argentine expatriate sportspeople in the United States
Argentine expatriate sportspeople in Brazil
People from San Juan, Argentina
Sportspeople from San Juan Province, Argentina